Colleen Joy Shogan is an 
American author and academic who is the nominee to serve as archivist of the United States. Shogan is also the director of the David M. Rubenstein Center for White House History at the White House Historical Association.

Early life and education 
Born and raised in Greater Pittsburgh, Shogan graduated from Norwin High School. She earned a Bachelor of Arts degree in political science from Boston College and a PhD in American politics from Yale University.

Career 
After earning her PhD, Shogan worked as an associate professor of government and politics at George Mason University. She is the author of Moral Rhetoric of American Presidents, a book on the rhetorical presidency. Shogan later joined the Library of Congress, where she served as assistant deputy for collections and deputy director of the Congressional Research Service. Shogan worked as the vice chair of the Women’s Suffrage Centennial Commission and taught as an adjunct professor in the government department at Georgetown University.

She is the author of eight murder mystery novels, featuring Washington congressional aide Kit Marshall.

Testimony Before Congress 
While testifying before the Senate, Senator Josh Hawley brought to the attention of the Senate that, during her September 2022 statements to Senator Portman, she was asked about Twitter statements she's made, which were described as inappropriate and partisan.  She asserted that all of her posts were about her dog and her mystery novels.   she was read her posts individually by Hawley.  She refused to answer questions about these posts.

On another occasion a whistle blower alleged that, while working at Sierra, she was partisan, abusive and tried to arrange for her books to be marketed on federal land.  She also allowed subordinates to make derogatory racial statements about this whistle blower (who is a woman of color).

References

American political scientists
Boston College alumni
George Mason University alumni
Georgetown University alumni
Living people
Yale Graduate School of Arts and Sciences alumni
1975 births